Medrano is a municipality in La Rioja, Spain. It is situated 17 km from the capital Logroño. There are 188 inhabitants and it covers 7.46 km². Its name is derived from the Medrano family.

See also 

 List of municipalities in La Rioja
 Medrano (disambiguation)
 Luisa de Medrano

External links 

 Medrano — La Rioja — Comunidad Riojana

Municipalities in La Rioja (Spain)